Captain Spanky's Show Boat is a 1939 Our Gang short comedy film directed by Edward Cahn.  It was the 183rd Our Gang short (184th episode, 95th talking short, 96th talking episode, and 15th MGM produced episode) that was released.

Plot
Once again, the gang stages an elaborate musical show in Spanky's backyard. Angered over the fact that Alfalfa has been chosen as the show's singing star, bully Tommy Butch sneaks backstage with the intention of sabotaging the production. But Butch is hoisted on his own petard, and the show goes on as scheduled.

Cast

The Gang
 George McFarland as Spanky
 Mickey Gubitosi as Mickey
 Darla Hood as Darla
 Carl Switzer as Alfalfa
 Billie Thomas as Buckwheat
 Shirley Coates - Muggsy
 Leonard Landy - Leonard

Additional cast
 Tommy Bond as Butch
 Sidney Kibrick as Woim
 Buddy Boles as Violinist
 George Crosby as One of Darla's dance partners
 Darwood Kaye as Waldo
 Clyde Wilson as Boy introducing acts
 Tim Davis as Extra
 Spencer Quinn as Extra

See also
 Our Gang filmography

References

External links
 
 

1939 films
American black-and-white films
Films directed by Edward L. Cahn
Metro-Goldwyn-Mayer short films
1939 comedy films
Our Gang films
1939 short films
1930s American films